Claudio Matías Velásquez (born 18 February 1986, in Rosario) is an Argentine football striker who currently plays for Deportivo Llacuabamba.

Velásquez started his professional playing career in 2006 with Rosario Central in a 3-0 win over Tiro Federal.

External links 
 
 Claudio Velásquez at BDFA.com.ar 

1986 births
Living people
Footballers from Rosario, Santa Fe
Argentine footballers
Argentine expatriate footballers
Association football forwards
Rosario Central footballers
José Gálvez FBC footballers
Club Alianza Lima footballers
Cobresol FBC footballers
Club Deportivo Universidad César Vallejo footballers
América de Cali footballers
Independiente Rivadavia footballers
Serrato Pacasmayo players
Jaguares de Córdoba footballers
Los Caimanes footballers
Peruvian Primera División players
Peruvian Segunda División players
Primera Nacional players
Argentine Primera División players
Categoría Primera A players
Categoría Primera B players
Expatriate footballers in Peru
Expatriate footballers in Colombia
Argentine expatriate sportspeople in Peru
Argentine expatriate sportspeople in Colombia